is a district in the city of Nanyo, Yamagata, Japan.

The town is the site of the Yuzuru no Sato Museum, which has an animation of Urushiyama's famous crane story, and an exhibition related to silk production, a major industry in the area until World War II. The museum also serves as a venue for traditional Japanese storytelling.

Education
It has one elementary school and one junior high school. Urushiyama Junior High School was integrated into Miyauchi Junior High School in 2008.

Transport
Urushiyama lies on National Route 113, and is served by Orihata Station on the Flower Nagai Line.

Crane Story
Urushiyama is best known as the setting of one of Japan's famous crane stories, The Grateful Crane Wife, which is linked to the Chinzo Temple in the town.

In the story, a man named Kinzo helps to rescue a crane. The grateful crane later thanks Kinzo by turning into a woman and becoming his wife. She makes valuable cloth for him to sell at the market, on the condition that he does not watch her as she makes them.

Eventually, curiosity gets the better of Kinzo and he sneaks a glimpse into the room she works in. He is shocked to see a crane producing the cloth. Because he has broken his promise, the crane ascends to heaven. Kinzo is ashamed and becomes a priest, praying for the crane every day.

Nan'yō, Yamagata